A trichoadenoma is a cutaneous condition characterized by a solitary, rapidly growing skin lesion ranging from 3 to 15mm in diameter.

See also 
 Dilated pore
 Pilar sheath acanthoma
 Skin lesion
 List of cutaneous conditions

References

External links 

Epidermal nevi, neoplasms, and cysts